Joanna Gail (born 11 April 1986) is a Greek softball player. She competed in the women's tournament at the 2004 Summer Olympics.

References

1986 births
Living people
Greek softball players
Olympic softball players of Greece
Softball players at the 2004 Summer Olympics
Sportspeople from Redondo Beach, California
Softball players from California